The South American Championship 1953 was a football tournament held in Peru and won by Paraguay with Brazil second. Argentina, and Colombia withdrew from the tournament. Francisco Molina from Chile became top scorer of the tournament with 7 goals.

Squads

Venues

Final round 

Match was awarded to Peru due to unsportsmanlike behaviour of Paraguay by making one extra change.  Milner Ayala was banned for three years for kicking the referee.

Match was suspended after 66th min, and awarded to Chile due to unsportsmanlike behaviour of Bolivia.

Play-off

Result

Goal scorers 
7 Goals
  Molina

5 Goals
  Julinho

4 Goals

  Berni
  Fernández
  Balseiro

3 Goals

  Baltazar
  Atilio López
  Carlos Romero
  Peláez

2 Goals

  Alcón
  Ramón Santos
  Ugarte
  Pinga
  Francisco Rodrigues
  Gómez Sánchez
  Morel
  Puente

1 Goal

  Ademir
  Cláudio
  Ipojucan
  Nílton Santos
  Zizinho
  Cremaschi
  Díaz Carmona
  Meléndez
  Guzmán
  Angel Romero
  León
  Gavilán
  Navarrete
  Terry
  Méndez

References

External links 
 South American Championship 1953 at RSSSF

 
Copa América tournaments
South American Championship
South
1953
February 1953 sports events in South America
South American Championship
South American Championship
Sports competitions in Lima
1950s in Lima